Morris the Midget Moose is a 1950 Walt Disney animated short, based on a 1945 picture book published by G.P. Putnam's sons, written and illustrated by Frank Owen, originally released to theaters on November 24, 1950, from Walt Disney Productions, originally released by RKO Radio Pictures and then, Buena Vista Distribution for its re-release.

Plot
This cartoon is a two heads is better than one parable. The bootle beetle (from Donald Duck cartoons, such as Bootle Beetle, The Greener Yard and Sea Salts) tells two younger beetles, who are fighting to reach a piece of fruit that is out of their reach, the story of Morris, a four-year-old moose, who has not grown beyond the stages of a child and is the laughing stock among the other moose. Morris is a small moose with large antlers, and meets up one day with Balsam, a large moose with embarrassingly small antlers. Morris and Balsam become good friends. Thunderclap the strongest bull moose is constantly challenging and defending his title as head moose. The two defeat Thunderclap with Morris standing on Balsam's back. The combined strength of Morris and Balsam becomes too much for Thunderclap. In the end the sum of the two was greater than the parts & the beetles learn the lesson by standing on each other's shoulders to reach the far hanging fruit.

Production 
The film was co-directed by Jack Hannah and Charles Nichols, the story was adapted by Bill Berg, written by Eric Gurney, Bill de la Torre, produced by Walt Disney, music by Oliver Wallace, animation by Jack Boyd, Jerry Hathcock, George Kreisl and George Nicholas, layouts by Karl Karpe, the backgrounds by Ray Huffine. It featured the voices of Clarence Nash and Dink Trout.

Home media
The short was released on December 6, 2005, on Walt Disney Treasures: Disney Rarities - Celebrated Shorts: 1920s–1960s.

References

External links

1950s Disney animated short films
1950 short films
Fictional deer and moose
1950 animated films
Films directed by Jack Hannah
Films directed by Charles August Nichols
Films produced by Walt Disney
Films scored by Oliver Wallace
1950s English-language films
American animated short films
Animated films about mammals